The  New York Giants season was the franchise's 67th season in the National Football League. The Giants entered the season as the defending Super Bowl champion but failed to qualify for the playoffs. They were the eighth team in NFL history to enter a season as the defending Super Bowl champion and miss the playoffs, and became the first organization in NFL history to do so twice (the Giants missed out on the playoffs a season after winning Super Bowl XXI as well).

The 1991 season marked the first season that the Mara family did not have total ownership of the Giants. Wellington Mara's nephew Tim, who had inherited the half-stake in the team that his grandfather and namesake had given to Tim's father Jack, decided that he no longer wanted to be involved with the team after twenty-six years, most of which had been spent feuding with his uncle over the team's operations. On February 2, 1991, shortly after Super Bowl XXV, Tim Mara announced he had sold his family's stake in the team to businessman Bob Tisch, the co-founder of Loews Corporation and former United States Postmaster General. Tisch did not take an active role in the operations of the team, instead choosing to focus on the team's finances; this enabled the Maras to keep control of the football side of the team and allowed Wellington Mara's son John to take a more active role with the Giants.

The 1991 season also marked the first time since 1983 that the Giants entered the season with a new head coach. Bill Parcells decided to retire following the Super Bowl victory and general manager George Young chose to promote Ray Handley, the team's running backs coach, to the position instead of promoting defensive coordinator Bill Belichick; Belichick would leave the Giants soon after to become head coach of the Cleveland Browns.

During the Giants' previous season Phil Simms entered the year as the starter and started the first fourteen games of the season. In the course of that fourteenth game, where the Giants hosted the Buffalo Bills, Simms suffered a severe foot injury and backup Jeff Hostetler took over and led the Giants through the playoffs and to their Super Bowl victory over those same Bills.

Simms did recover from his injury and was expected to regain his starting position, but Handley decided to make Simms and Hostetler compete for the position. Handley made his decision prior to the Giants' week one matchup with the San Francisco 49ers on Monday Night Football and gave the starting job to Hostetler amid some controversy. Hostetler led the Giants to 6 wins in his eleven starts, but broke his back during a week 13 win against Tampa Bay. Simms returned to finish the game, but went 2–3 as Giants starter the remainder of the year and the Giants fell out of the playoffs.

Offseason
After the 1990 season, in which the Giants won the Super Bowl, the Giants lost several members of their coaching staff. In addition to Parcells and Belichick, wide receivers coach Tom Coughlin took the head coaching position Boston College; he was said to have been the first choice to replace Parcells and would have done so had he not left the Giants.

NFL Draft

Roster

Regular season

Schedule

Game summaries

Week 7: at Pittsburgh Steelers

Standings

Awards and honors

See also
List of New York Giants seasons

References

External links
 New York Giants on Pro Football Reference
 Giants on jt-sw.com

New York Giants seasons
New York Giants
New York Giants season
20th century in East Rutherford, New Jersey
Meadowlands Sports Complex